Thad "Pie" Vann (September 22, 1907 – September 7, 1982) was an American football and baseball coach.  He served as the head football coach at the University of Southern Mississippi—known as Mississippi Southern College prior to 1962—from 1949 to 1968.  During his tenure, he compiled a 139–59–2 record and helped transform Mississippi Southern into one of the nation's elite programs. His only losing season came in 1968, after 19 consecutive winning seasons. His 1953 team went 9–2, including a major upset against Alabama. His 1954 team went 6–4 and upset Alabama once again.  He was also the head baseball coach at Mississippi Southern from 1948 to 1949, tallying a mark of 21–21.  Van died on September 7, 1982, at Veterans Administration Hospital in Jackson, Mississippi, following long illness. He was inducted into the College Football Hall of Fame in 1987.

Head coaching record

Football

References

External links
 
 

1907 births
1982 deaths
American football tackles
Ole Miss Rebels football players
Southern Miss Golden Eagles baseball coaches
Southern Miss Golden Eagles football coaches
College Football Hall of Fame inductees
People from Magnolia, Mississippi